Maximilianstraße may refer to one of the following places in Germany:

Maximilianstraße (Augsburg), a street
Maximilianstraße (Munich), a street
Maximilianstraße station, a U-Bahn station in Nuremberg